Coningsby railway station was a station in Coningsby, Lincolnshire on the Kirkstead and Little Steeping Railway which ran between Lincoln and Firsby. The site has been landscaped with no trace of the station left. The station masters house survives as a private residence.

References

Disused railway stations in Lincolnshire
Former Great Northern Railway stations
Railway stations in Great Britain opened in 1913
Railway stations in Great Britain closed in 1915
Railway stations in Great Britain opened in 1923
Railway stations in Great Britain closed in 1970
1913 establishments in England